Ismail Jumaih is a Maldivian actor, choreographer and makeup artist.

Career
In 2016, Jumaih made his film debut in Hussain Munawwar's Neyngi Yaaru Vakivee alongside Aminath Rishfa and Ahmed Azmeel. Critics gave the film bad reviews and considered his performance as Sham, to be "boring" while criticising the character development. However, Ahmed Jaishan of Vaguthu, found Jumaih's acting to be "natural and impressive" considering his debut role and picked him as the "biggest highlight" from the "disappointing" film. Despite the negative reviews, the film did average business at the end of its run. Jumaih's other release of the year came with Fathimath Nahula's horror film 4426, where he portrayed the role of Hanim, an aggressive member of the friends who get trapped in a haunted house. Upon release, the film received mostly positive reviews from critics. Ahmed Nadheem of Avas labelled the film as a "masterpiece" and mentioned Jumaih to be the "surprising element" of the film. Complimenting the improvements he showed from Neyngi Yaaru Vakivee, Nadheem picked his role as the second best performance of the film; "With compliments to Nahula for her character building, Jumaih was deep in the character of Hanim, portraying the role to its fullest". With twenty-five back-to-back housefull shows being screened, 4426 was declared as the highest grossing Maldive film of the year. At the 8th Gaumee Film Awards Jumaih received a nomination for Best Male Debut award for his performance in Neyngi Yaaru Vakivee with another nomination for Best Makeup in 4426.

Filmography

Feature film

Television

Short film

Accolades

References 

Living people
Maldivian male film actors
Year of birth missing (living people)
21st-century Maldivian male actors